The John Wyeth House is a historic house in Cambridge, Massachusetts.

Description 
It is a -story wood-frame structure, with a side-gable roof and two irregularly-placed chimneys. A porch extends across the front, supported by fluted Ionic columns. It was built in 1841, and originally stood across the street from the gate of Mount Auburn Cemetery. It was moved to its present location in 1922–23; it is one of the oldest Greek Revival houses in Northwest Cambridge.

The house was listed on the National Register of Historic Places on April 13, 1982.

See also
National Register of Historic Places listings in Cambridge, Massachusetts

References

Houses completed in 1841
Houses on the National Register of Historic Places in Cambridge, Massachusetts
Greek Revival houses in Massachusetts